For the 1994 Vuelta a España, the field consisted of 169 riders; 122 finished the race.

By rider

By nationality

References

Further reading

 Cyclists
1994